Shalva Weil is a Senior Researcher at The Seymour Fox School of Education at the Hebrew University of Jerusalem, Israel. In 2017, she was GIAN Distinguished Professor at Jawaharlal Nehru University, in New Delhi. She has researched Indian Jews, Ethiopian Jews, and the Ten Lost Tribes and specializes in femicide, qualitative methods, violence, ethnicity, education, religion, and migration.

Education
Shalva Weil was born in London and studied sociology (B.A. Hons.) at the London School of Economics (L.S.E). She received an M.A. at the Centre for Multi-Racial Studies, Sussex University, on a double identity conflict among Bene Israel Indian Jews in Britain, supervised by the psychologist Marie Jahoda. She then obtained a D. Phil. in Social Anthropology at Sussex, under the supervision of Prof. A.L. Epstein. Her doctoral thesis on "The Persistence of Ethnicity and Ethnic Identity among the Bene Israel Indian Jews in Israel" (1977) was based on three years' fieldwork among the Bene Israel in the town of Lod.

Academic Work

Indian Jewry 
Weil has published over 100 articles on India Jews, including on the Bene Israel, Cochin Jews, Baghdadi Jews, the Shinlung (“Bnei Menashe”) and Europeans in India. She is editor of India's Jewish Heritage: Ritual, Art, and Life-Cycle (Marg 2002; 3rd edition 2009), co-editor (with Nathan Katz, Ranabir Chakravarti and Braj M. Sinha) of Indo-Judaic Studies in the Twenty-First Century: A Perspective from the Margin (Palgrave-Macmillan, 2007); and co-editor (with David Shulman) of Karmic Passages: Israeli Scholarship on India (Delhi: Oxford University Press 2008). In 2019, she edited The Baghdadi Jews in India: Maintaining Communities, Negotiating Identities and Creating Super-Diversity (Routledge, 2019), and The Jews of Goa (Primus, 2019).

In 1991, she curated an exhibition at Beth Hatefutsoth: the Museum of the Jewish Diaspora on the Ten Lost Tribes. In 2002, she organized an international conference at Oxford University on Indo-Judaic studies, a field in which she is a forerunner. She is on the editorial board of Indian and international journals, including the Journal of Indo-Judaic Studies. In 2006, she co-curated an exhibition on the Jews of Chendamangalam in the newly restored village synagogue in Kerala, and was involved in the restoration of the Parur Cochin Jews synagogue.

In March 2013, she lectured and co-organized a conference in Eilat, Israel and Aqaba, Jordan on ancient trade in the Red Sea. In May 2013, she was invited to lecture at Stanford University on the Kirtan among Indian Jews, followed by lectures in the Department of South Asian Studies at Santa Barbara University, and at the Magnes Museum at Berkeley University in California on the reconstruction of synagogues in Kerala. In 2017, she was invited to be a keynote speaker at IGNCA at a symposium on India's Jews. In 2018, she attended the meetings in Mumbai with PM Benjamin Netanyahu and the Indian Jewish community. In 2019 she lectured on the Jews Goa,  at the ICAS conference at Leiden University in the Netherlands.

Ethiopian Jewry
Weil's studies on Ethiopian Jews have been commissioned by government ministries: on religion, one-parent families, education, leadership, and femicide. In 2005, she was elected President of SOSTEJE (Society for the Study of Ethiopian Jewry) at the Addis Ababa University, and in this capacity organized international conferences on the Beta Israel: in Florence, Italy and in Gondar, Ethiopia, as well as writing regular newsletters on the study of Ethiopian Jewry until her resignation in 2012. She has written many scientific articles on Ethiopian Jews, as well as several books, including a volume (together with Emanuela Trevisan Semi) Beta Israel: the Jews of Ethiopia and Beyond (Venice: Cafoscarina, 2011). For 12 years, she directed an outreach program to promote excellence in education among Ethiopian Jews in Israel. she has written about the complexities of conversion among the Felesmura, and conducting original research into Dr. Faitlovitch's Ethiopian Jews students educated in Europe (1905-1935).

Femicide
In 2009, Weil wrote a report for the Israeli Ministry of Immigrant Absorption on wife-murder among Ethiopian immigrants, which was censored.  From 2013-7 Weil Chaired a COST (Cooperation on Science and Technology) action on "Femicide Across Europe" with 80 representatives from 30 countries on the management committee. The Action set up four working groups in Europe on definitions, on reporting, on culture, and on prevention. The final COST conference took place in Malta. Weil has called to make femicide a visible sociological fact, while recognizing that its study is a social challenge. Femicide is difficult to research among migrants and utilizing qualitative methods. It affects girls, not just women, particularly in countries like India. Weil's recent publications include the connections between femicide and Covid-19, both of which she considers pandemics, and the issue of female geronticide, or the killing of elderly women. Weil is on the Advisory Board of the European Observatory on Femincide (EOF) and several other observatories. She chairs the Israel Observatory on Femicide (IOF).

Ten Lost Tribes
Weil has published extensively on the Ten Lost Tribes historically and in contemporary times. In particular, she has written on the Beta Israel, the Bene Israel, and the Pashtuns, as well as on Judaising groups all over Africa, China and elsewhere. In 1991, she curated an exhibition at Beth Hatefutsoth: the Museum of the Jewish Diaspora on the Ten Lost Tribes entitled "Beyond the Sambatyon: the Myth of the Ten Lost Tribes". She is on the international board of ISSAJ [International Society for the Study of African Jewry], and presented a paper at their latest conference in Nairobi on the Jews of Africa.

Other work
Weil utilizes diverse methodological tools such as the mapping tool, diaries, interviews, focus groups, and life histories. She documented violence in schools in a joint Israeli-Palestinian project, and conducted a qualitative study on pedagogic change in schools among Israeli principals, commissioned by Avnei Rosha, an Institute in Jerusalem.

In 2010, she interviewed Prof. S.N. Eisenstadt, in the last interview before he died. As editor of European Sociologist, she interviewed Prof. Zygmunt Bauman. She coordinated the European Sociological Association (ESA) Qualitative Methods Research Network (2005-2007), taught methods at the ESA's Summer School in Finland in 2010, and collaborated with colleagues to co-chair a European Science Foundation (ESF) workshop on the legitimacy of qualitative methods. From 2007-11, she served as a member of the ESA Executive Committee, and today serves as a board member of the ESA Research Networks on gender and qualitative methods.

Publications

Books
1984 From Cochin to Israel, Jerusalem: Kumu Berina. (Hebrew)
1997 Ethiopian Jews in the Limelight, Jerusalem: Research Institute for Innovation in Education, Hebrew University.
1999 Roots and Routes: Ethnicity and Migration in Global Perspective, Jerusalem: Magnes Press, Hebrew University.
2004 Bibliography of Ethiopian Jewry, Addis Abeba: SOSTEJE (Society for the Study of Ethiopian Jewry).
2007 Katz N., Chakravarti, R., Sinha, B. M. and Weil, S. Indo-Judaic Studies in the Twenty-First Century: A Perspective from the Margin, New York and Basingstoke, England: Palgrave-Macmillan Press.
2008 Shulman, D. and Weil, S. Karmic Passages: Israeli Scholarship on India, New Delhi: Oxford University Press.
2009 (Third reprint) India's Jewish Heritage: Ritual, Art and Life-Cycle, Mumbai: Marg Publications [first published in 2002; second reprint 2004].
2011 Trevisan Semi, E. and Weil, S. Beta Israel: the Jews of Ethiopia and Beyond, Venice: Cafoscarina.
2018 Weil, S., Corradi, C. and Naudi, M. Femicide across Europe: theory, research and prevention, Bristol: Policy Press.
2019 The Sojourn of the Baghdadi Jews in India: Maintaining Communities, Negotiating Identities and Creating Super-Diversity, London: Routledge.
2020 The Jews of Goa, New Delhi: Primus.

References

Year of birth missing (living people)
Living people
Academic staff of the Hebrew University of Jerusalem